Eilikrina (Greek: Ειλικρινά; English: Sincerely) is the seventh studio album by popular Greek singer Nikos Oikonomopoulos, released in 2013 by Minos EMI.  Shortly after its release, it was reported that the album has achieved double platinum certificate in Greece.

Track listing

Singles
"Se Lipamai"
The lead single is "Se Lipamai" released on 30 September 2013. The video clip of the song was announced on 25 November 2013.

"Mi Figeis Tora"
The second single is "Mi Figeis Tora" released on 25 November 2013. The video clip of the song was announced on 9 January 2014.

"Exaitias Sou"
The third single is "Exaitias Sou". The video clip of the song was announced on 25 July 2014.

Chart performance 
The album was certified double platinum.

Personnel
Thanasis Papageorgiou – executive producer
Manolis Hiotis – photography
Dimitris Panagiotakopoulos – artwork
Giannis Ioannidis, Petros Siakavellas – mastering
Takis Argiriou – mixing
Alexandra Katsaiti – styling

References

2013 albums
Nikos Oikonomopoulos albums
Minos EMI albums
Greek-language albums